Abraham Placzek (January 1799 – 10 December 1884) was a Moravian rabbi, who served as Landesrabbiner of Moravia from 1851 until his death.

Placzek was born into a Jewish family in Prerau, Austria-Hungary (now Přerov, Czech Republic). In 1827 he became rabbi in his native city, and from 1832 to 1840 he officiated at Weisskirchen. We was then called to Boskowitz, where he served as rabbi until his death. 

In October 1851, he succeeded Samson Raphael Hirsch as acting Landesrabbiner of Moravia. In this office he defended the rights of the Jews, and supported  efforts against liturgical reform. Placzek was a prominent Talmudic scholar, as well as a successful teacher, and carried on correspondence with eminent rabbis, in whose collections of responsa his name is frequently mentioned.

References
 

1799 births
1884 deaths
19th-century Czech rabbis
Rabbis of the Austrian Empire
Austro-Hungarian rabbis
Chief rabbis of Moravia
Czech Orthodox rabbis
People from Boskovice
People from Přerov
People from the Margraviate of Moravia